In English law, heirs of the body is the principle that certain types of property pass to a descendant of the original holder, recipient or grantee according to a fixed order of kinship. Upon the death of the grantee, a designated inheritance such as a parcel of land, a peerage, or a monarchy, passes automatically to that living, legitimate, natural descendant of the grantee who is most senior in descent according to primogeniture, males being preferred, however, over their sisters regardless of relative age; and thereafter the property continues to pass to subsequent descendants of the grantee, according to the same formula, upon the death of each subsequent heir. 

Baronies created by writ of summons to Parliament usually descend to heirs of the body of the grantee, and may thus be inherited by females. By the terms of the Act of Settlement 1701 and the Acts of Union 1707, the Crown of the United Kingdom of Great Britain and Northern Ireland descends to heirs of the body of the Electress Sophia of Hanover who are not Catholics or married to Catholics, subject to subsequent modification by Parliament (e.g. His Majesty's Declaration of Abdication Act 1936 and the Succession to the Crown Act 2013).

In property law, a conveyance by the owner O "To A and heirs of the body", without more, creates a fee tail for the grantee (A) with a reversion in the grantor (O) should the natural, lawful descendants of the grantee all die out. Each person who inherits according to this formula is considered an heir at law of the grantee. Since the inheritance may not pass to someone who is not a natural, lawful descendant of the grantee, the heir is necessarily also "of the body" of the grantee. Collateral kin, who share some or all of the grantee's ancestry, but do not directly descend from the grantee, may not inherit. When there are no more heirs of the body, the terms of the original grant are expired, and the property becomes extinct (e.g. peerage), or some other criterion for allocating the property to a new possessor must be applied. If the original grant stipulated an alternative formula for succession upon exhaustion of heirs, that formula is immediately applicable. Thus, if a peerage is granted to "heirs of the body of John Smith, failing which, to heirs general", the title would pass to a descendant of John Smith's sibling when all of John Smith's descendants die out.

Thus property settled upon someone and the heirs of their body—whether male, female, or generally—will pass to children, grandchildren and so on, but not to nephews of the grantee, his or her sisters, uncles and their descendants. Nor will a limitation in a grant to someone's "heirs" carry the property to collateral heirs in England, since the law presumes that "heirs of the body" are meant though a grant to the grantee and his heirs male will.

There are other kinds of formulae for inheritance than heirs of the body, such as heirs male, heirs of the line, heirs portioners, heirs general, etc.

References

Inheritance
English law